Permanganic acid (or manganic(VII) acid) is the inorganic compound with the formula  HMnO4.  This strong oxoacid has been isolated as its dihydrate.  It is the conjugate acid of permanganate salts. It is the subject of few publications and its characterization as well as its uses are very limited.

Preparation and structure
Permanganic acid is most often prepared by the reaction of dilute sulfuric acid with a solution of barium permanganate, the insoluble barium sulfate byproduct being removed by filtering:

Ba(MnO4)2 + H2SO4 → 2 HMnO4 + BaSO4↓
The sulfuric acid used must be dilute; reactions of permanganates with concentrated sulfuric acid yield the anhydride, manganese heptoxide.

Permanganic acid has also been prepared through the reaction of hydrofluorosilicic acid with potassium permanganate, through electrolysis, and through hydrolysis of manganese heptoxide, though the last route often results in explosions.

Crystalline permanganic acid has been prepared at low temperatures as the dihydrate, HMnO4·2H2O.

Although its structure has not been verified spectroscopically or crystallographically, HMnO4 is assumed to be adopt a tetrahedral structure akin to that for perchloric acid.

Reactions
As a strong acid, HMnO4 is deprotonated to form the intensely purple coloured permanganates.  Potassium permanganate, KMnO4, is a widely used, versatile and powerful oxidising agent.

Permanganic acid solutions are unstable, and gradually decompose into manganese dioxide, oxygen, and water, with initially formed manganese dioxide catalyzing further decomposition. Decomposition is accelerated by heat, light, and acids.  Concentrated solutions decompose more rapidly than dilute.

References

Hydrogen compounds
Manganese(VII) compounds
Oxidizing agents
Oxidizing acids
Mineral acids
Transition metal oxoacids